Michel Mouskhely (Mouskheli) born Mikheil Muskhelishvili (July 8, 1903 – July 11, 1964) was a Georgian-French political scientist and jurist.

Born in Tbilisi, Georgia, then part of Russian Empire, Muskheli emigrated to Western Europe following the Red Army invasion of Georgia in 1921. He then studied at Göttingen, Munich, Lyons, and Paris. After his brief work for the University of Paris (1932–33), he lectured at the University of Cairo from 1935 to 1948. In 1948, he became a Professor of International Law and of Political and Economic Sciences at the University of Strasbourg. Mouskhely organized and directed a center for Soviet studies at the Strasbourg law faculty which began in 1960 publication of abstracts from the principal Soviet periodicals dealing with the social sciences. Mouskhely wrote a number of works on federalism, and drafted, together with Professor Gaston Stefani, a 1948 European federal constitution which was submitted to the International Coordinating Committee of the Movements for European Unity, but had no direct effect on the latter's work.

References 

1903 births
1964 deaths
Soviet emigrants to France
French legal scholars
French jurists
French political scientists
Academic staff of the University of Strasbourg
Writers from Tbilisi
French male non-fiction writers
Academic staff of Cairo University
20th-century French male writers
20th-century political scientists